Lanz and Cox Islands Provincial Park (formerly Scott Islands Marine Provincial Park) is a provincial park in British Columbia, Canada. It is located off Cape Scott on northern Vancouver Island.

See also
Triangle Island, one of the other Scott Islands
Scott Islands Marine National Wildlife Area

References

Provincial parks of British Columbia
Central Coast of British Columbia
Northern Vancouver Island
1995 establishments in British Columbia
Protected areas established in 1995